Sevran is a commune in the French department of Seine-Saint-Denis, northeastern suburbs of Paris, Île-de-France.

Geography
Sevran is located northeast of the Boulevard Périphérique.

Demographics

Immigration

As of 2013 the origins of over half of its resident are from outside France. The largest ethnic backgrounds within the foreign origins are from sub-Saharan Africa, Algeria, and Morocco.

In 2013 The Economist stated that Sevran was one of the poorest areas of the Paris Metropolitan Area. As of 2013 36% of the residents are considered to be below the poverty line. The national average is 12%. About 75% of Sevran's residents live in subsidized housing. The article also cites research that says "somebody called Mohamed, Ali or Kamel is four times more likely to be unemployed than somebody named Philippe or Alain."

Culture
Sevran is home to an important music and dance school, the Espace François Mauriac, also known as the conservatoire de Sevran. Many important French and international musicians have taught there, including Claude Ballif, Allain Gaussin and Vincent Decleire. The famous French rapper Kaaris is also from Sevran, born to parents from Ivory Coast.

Women are unofficially banned from public spaces by men in some areas of Sevran and will not receive service in bars or cafés. Authorities turn a blind eye as the men support the mayor.

Heraldry

Transport

Sevran is served by two stations on Paris RER line B: Sevran – Livry and Sevran – Beaudottes.

Education
Schools:
15 public preschools (maternelles):
16 public primary schools:
1 private preschool: École maternelle Sainte-Agnès/École élémentaire Sainte-Agnès
Junior high schools: Collège Evariste Galois, Collège Georges Brassens, Collège Paul Painlevé, and Collège La Pléïade
Senior high school/sixth-form college: Lycée Blaise Cendrars

See also
Communes of the Seine-Saint-Denis department

References

External links

 Official website

Communes of Seine-Saint-Denis
Seine-Saint-Denis communes articles needing translation from French Wikipedia